Nugara is a rural locality in the local government area (LGA) of King Island in the North-west and west LGA region of Tasmania. The 2016 census recorded a population of 81 for the state suburb of Nugara.

History 
Nugara is a confirmed locality.

Geography
The waters of the Southern Ocean form the south-western boundary.

Road infrastructure 
Route B25 (Grassy Road) runs through from west to east.

References

Towns in Tasmania
King Island (Tasmania)